Gymnopus is a genus of fungus in the family Omphalotaceae. The genus has a widespread, cosmopolitan distribution and contains about 300 species.

History and classification  
The type species for the Gymnopus, Gymnopus fusipes, dates back to 1806 [(Pers.) Roussel]. Many of the species now classified in the Gymnopus genera were once assigned to Collybia. In 1997 it was suggested that the Collybia genus be split into three genera, one of them being Gymnopus.

Description 
In general, Gymnopus fruiting bodies are found in leaf and woody litter. Typically the fruiting bodies are relatively small and range from browns to white in color. Their spore deposit is white. Most species of gymnopus act as decomposers (saprotrophic).  With one known exception (G. subnudus), the mating patterns of gymnopus all seem to be bifactorial, meaning that there is more than one locus responsible for regulating mating compatibility.

Representative species

Gymnopus dryophilus
Gymnopus fusipes
Gymnopus peronatus
Gymnopus semihirtipes
Gymnopus quercophilus

See also
List of Marasmiaceae genera

References

Further reading

Marasmiaceae
Agaricales genera